MUSE (Mission to Uranus for Science and Exploration) is a European proposal for a dedicated mission to the planet Uranus to study its atmosphere, interior, moons, rings, and magnetosphere. It is proposed to be launched with an Ariane 6 in 2026, travel for 16.5 years to reach Uranus in 2044, and would operate until 2050.

The European Space Operations Centre would monitor and control the mission, as well as generate and provide the raw data sets. In 2012, the cost was estimated at €1.8 billion. The mission addresses the themes of the ESA Cosmic Vision 2015–2025. This was designed as an L-Class flagship level mission; however, it is constrained by the need for RTGs. MUSE was also analyzed in the US as an Enhanced New Frontiers class mission in 2014.

Orbiter

The orbiter science phase would consist on the Uranus Science Orbit (USO) phase of approximately 2 years in a highly elliptic polar orbit to provide best gravimetry data, during which 36 Uranus orbits are performed.

Subsequently, the orbiter will continue to the Moon Tour (MT) phase, which would last three years. During this phase, the periapsis would be raised, facilitating nine flybys of each of Uranus' five major moons: Miranda, Ariel, Umbriel, Titania, and Oberon.

Because of the long distance from the Sun (20 AU on average), the orbiter would not be able to use solar panels, requiring instead four Advanced Stirling Radioisotope Generators (ASRGs) to be developed by ESA. The propulsion system for the Earth-Uranus transfer would be chemical:  Monomethylhydrazine and Mixed Oxides of Nitrogen (MMH/MON) propellant combination is used.

Atmospheric probe

Understanding why Uranus emits such a small amount of heat can only be done in the context of thermodynamic modeling of the atmosphere (density, pressure, and temperature). Therefore, the atmosphere needs to be characterized from both a composition and a thermodynamic point of view. The  chemical information to retrieve is the elemental concentrations, especially of disequilibrium species, isotopic ratios and noble gases, in combination with information regarding the distribution of aerosol particles with depth.

Twenty days before entry, the atmospheric probe would separate from the spacecraft and enter the outer atmosphere of Uranus at an altitude of 700 km at 21.8 km/s. It would descend by free fall and perform atmospheric measurements for about 90 minutes down to a maximum of  pressure.

Proposed instruments
In the table below, a green background denotes instruments to go on the entry probe; the rest are for the orbiter.

MUSE as new New Frontiers mission
In 2014, a paper was released considering MUSE under the constraints of an enhanced New Frontiers mission. This included a cost cap of US$1.5 billion, and one of the big differences was the use of an Atlas V 551 rocket.

See also
Atmosphere of Uranus
Exploration of Uranus
Moons of Uranus
Uranus mission proposals
 ODINUS
 NASA Uranus orbiter and probe
 Oceanus
 Uranus Pathfinder

References

Missions to Uranus
Orbiters (space probe)
Proposed space probes
European Space Agency space probes
2026 in spaceflight